The M156 is the first automobile V8 engine designed autonomously by Mercedes-Benz subsidiary Mercedes-AMG, as previous AMG engines have always been based on original Mercedes engines. The engine was designed to be a naturally aspirated racing unit, and is also used in a number of high-performance AMG-badged Mercedes-Benz models.

M156
The M156 displaces  and shares very little with other Mercedes-Benz engine families like the M155. The bore spacing, block design, and other features are unique to the AMG engine.

Although this engine displaces 6.2 litres, it is marketed as the "6.3" to commemorate Mercedes' famed 6.3 L M100 engine, its first production V8.

The 2007 ML63 had , and the 2008 C63 had . The final 2015 C63 had .

Applications:
 2006-2011 E 63 AMG
 2006-2011 ML 63 AMG
 2006 R 63 AMG
 2006-2011 S 63 AMG
 2006-2011 CL 63 AMG
 2006-2010 CLK 63 AMG
 2006-2010 CLS 63 AMG
 2008-2015 C 63 AMG
 2008-2011 SL 63 AMG
2013 Lucra LC470 R

M156 lawsuit
In 2011, a class action lawsuit was filed in United States District Court in New Jersey against Daimler AG, Mercedes-Benz, Mercedes-AMG for alleged defects in the M156 engine contained in AMG vehicles built in 2007–2011 model years leading to premature wear. The plaintiff claimed the combination of cast nodular iron camshafts and 9310 grade steel valve lifters contributed to the premature wear, but the defendants had known about the defect since 2007.

The lawsuit lasted approximately 14-months. In November, 2012, litigation came to a halt when the New Jersey District Court dismissed the plaintiffs’ first amended complaint for lack of standing. The plaintiffs were given the opportunity to further amend their complaint to show that they had standing to sue, but plaintiffs made no further filings with the Court. On January 7, 2013, the Court signed an order closing the case.

M156 common issues

Some of the main issues that linger in all M156 models consist of failure of the breather valve. The most common issue with the breather valve is that the diaphragm on the valve deteriorates over time. Another issue with the breather valve is that the hose from the crankcase to the valve also deteriorates and starts to crack. These issues can cause excess oil burning, heavy smoke from tail pipes and misfires. Other common issues are premature wear of engine lifters and camshafts as well as cam shaft adjusters. Common signs of this is a ticking noise at cold start of the vehicle. Other common issues consist of intake manifold failure, head bolt issues in models from 07 to 11 and drive belt pulleys.

M159
The M159 is a version used in Mercedes-Benz SLS AMG and current AMG GT3 racecar. Compared to the standard AMG engine, the SLS's engine includes an all-new intake system, reworked valvetrain and camshafts, the use of flow-optimised tubular steel headers and dethrottling of the exhaust system. The engine also utilizes a dry-sump lubrication system to lower the center of gravity of the car.

See also
List of Mercedes-Benz engines

References

General

External links
Engine and power transfer: Exclusive, high-performance eight-cylinder front-mid-engine and double-declutch transmission in a transaxle arrangement contains info on M159 engine

M156
V8 engines
Gasoline engines by model